"Watermelon Man" is a jazz standard written by Herbie Hancock for his debut album, Takin' Off (1962).

Hancock's first version was released as a grooving hard bop record, and featured improvisations by Freddie Hubbard and Dexter Gordon.  A single reached the Top 100 of the pop chart. Cuban percussionist Mongo Santamaría released the tune as a Latin pop single and it became a surprise hit, reaching No. 10 on the pop chart. Santamaría's recording was inducted into the Grammy Hall of Fame in 1998. Hancock radically re-worked the tune, combining elements of funk, for the album Head Hunters (1973).

1963 Herbie Hancock version
Hancock wrote the piece to help sell his debut album as a leader, Takin' Off (1962), on Blue Note Records; it was the first piece of music he had ever composed with a commercial goal in mind. The popularity of the piece, due primarily to Mongo Santamaría, paid Hancock's bills for five or six years. Hancock did not feel the composition was a sellout however, describing that structurally, it was one of his strongest pieces due to its almost mathematical balance.

The form is a sixteen bar blues. Recalling the piece, Hancock said, "I remember the cry of the watermelon man making the rounds through the back streets and alleys of Chicago. The wheels of his wagon beat out the rhythm on the cobblestones." The tune, based on a bluesy piano riff, drew on elements of R&B, soul jazz and bebop, all combined into a pop hook. Hancock joined bassist Butch Warren and drummer Billy Higgins in the rhythm section, with Freddie Hubbard on trumpet and Dexter Gordon on tenor saxophone. Hancock's chordal work draws from the gospel tradition, while he builds his solo on repeated riffs and trilled figures.

Mongo Santamaría version

Hancock filled in for pianist Chick Corea in Mongo Santamaría's band one weekend at a nightclub in The Bronx when Corea gave notice that he was leaving. Hancock played the tune for Santamaría at friend Donald Byrd's urging. Santamaría started accompanying him on his congas, then his band joined in, and the small audience slowly got up from their tables and started dancing, laughing and having a great time. Santamaría later asked Hancock if he could record the tune. On December 17, 1962, Mongo Santamaría recorded a three-minute version, suitable for radio, where he joined timbalero Francisco "Kako" Baster in a cha-cha beat, while drummer Ray Lucas performed a backbeat. With the enthusiasm of record producer Orrin Keepnews, the band re-recorded the song and released it as a single under Battle Records. The single reached number10 on Billboard in 1963. Santamaría included the track on his album Watermelon Man! (1963). Santamaría's recording is sometimes considered the beginning of Latin boogaloo, a fusion of Afro-Cuban rhythms with those of R&B.

Chart performance

1973 Herbie Hancock version
Hancock re-recorded the tune for Head Hunters (1973), combining synthesizers with a Sly Stone and James Brown funk influence, adding an eight-bar section. Hancock described his composition "Chameleon", also from Head Hunters, to Down Beat magazine in 1979: "In the popular forms of funk, which I've been trying to get into, the attention is on the rhythmic interplay between different instruments. The part the Clavinet plays has to fit with the part the drums play and the line the bass plays and the line that the guitar plays. It's almost like African drummers where seven drummers play different parts"; "Watermelon Man" shares a similar construction. A live version was released on the double LP Flood (1975), recorded in Japan.

On the intro and outro of the tune, percussionist Bill Summers blows into beer bottles imitating hindewhu, a style of singing/whistle-playing found in Pygmy music of Central Africa. Hancock and Summers were struck by the sound, which they heard on the  ethnomusicology album The Music of the Ba-Benzélé Pygmies (1966) by Simha Arom and Geneviève Taurelle.<ref name=Feld1996>Feld, Steven (1996). "Pygmy POP. A Genealogy of Schizophonic Mimesis. Yearbook for Traditional Music 28. p. 4-5.</ref>

This version was often featured on The Weather Channel's Local on the 8s segments. It was also played in the 2018 movie mid90s.

Other versions
The tune is a jazz standard and has been recorded over two hundred times: 
In 1963, Jamaican trumpeter Baba Brooks and his band recorded "Watermelon Man Ska." 
In 2003, pianist David Benoit covered the song from his album Right Here, Right Now.
A live and funky performance at the 1999 Montreux Jazz Festival Casino Lights '99 featured Fourplay, George Duke, Boney James and Kirk Whalum trading choruses, and Rick Braun.

Samples
Hancock's recording has been sampled in:
"1-900-LL-Cool-J" from Walking with a Panther (1989) by LL Cool J
"Open Your Eyes" from Organized Konfusion (1991) by Organized Konfusion
"Smoke Some Kill" from Smoke Some Kill (1988) by Schoolly D,
"Pocket Full of Furl" from Uptown 4 Life (1996) by U.N.L.V.
"Sanctuary" from Bedtime Stories (1994) by Madonna
"Dolly My Baby" from Don Dada (1992) by Super Cat

 Personnel 'Takin' Off version:
Herbie Hancock – piano
Dexter Gordon – tenor saxophone
Billy Higgins – drums, percussion
Freddie Hubbard – trumpet
Butch Warren – double bassHead Hunters version''':
Herbie Hancock – Fender Rhodes, clavinet, synthesizer
Bennie Maupin – soprano saxophone
Bill Summers – percussion, beer bottle, hindewhu
Harvey Mason – drums
Paul Jackson – bass guitar

References

1962 songs
1963 debut singles
1960s jazz standards
Hard bop jazz standards
Bill Haley songs
The J.B.'s songs
1960s instrumentals
Jazz compositions
Songs written by Herbie Hancock
Jazz compositions in F major
Jazz standards
Herbie Hancock songs
Herbie Hancock